Kohautia socotrana is a species of plant in the family Rubiaceae. It is endemic to Socotra island of Yemen, off the coast of Africa. Its natural habitats are subtropical or tropical dry forests and subtropical or tropical dry shrubland.

References

socotrana
Endemic flora of Socotra
Flora of Yemen
Data deficient plants
Taxonomy articles created by Polbot